Radio Télévision Guinéenne (RTG) is a public broadcaster of the West African state of Guinea. Radio Télévision Guinéenne is headquartered in the capital city of Conakry.

In 2007, a Guinean Air Force MiG-21 departing from Conakry crashed into the Radio Television Guineenne headquarters. The Russian pilot ejected and was unharmed.

External links
Official website

References

Publicly funded broadcasters
Television stations in Guinea
Television channels and stations established in 1957
State media